Ibibia Opuene Walter (born 8 July 1967) is a Rivers State geologist, businessman and political figure. From 2004 to 2007, he served as Chairman of Okrika Local Government Council. From 2013 to 2015, he served as Secretary of the Rivers State People's Democratic Party.

Walter is the founder and major shareholder of Lowpel and Geowaltek Nigeria Limited.
He is currently the Commissioner Rivers State Ministry of Transport.

Biography

Early life and education
Walter was born in Isaka town, Okrika local government area of Rivers State to Chief Livington and Mrs. Amisodiki Walter. He attended State School Isaka between 1972 and 1978. He received his secondary education at Okrika Grammar School and Government Sea School from 1979 to 1983. He then moved to Rivers State School of Basic Studies in Port Harcourt where he studied for A-Levels.

Walter's university education began with an admission to the University of Port Harcourt. He completed his BSc degree in Geology and acquired a postgraduate diploma in Applied Geology. He later earned his master's degree in Engineering and Hydrogeology from the same university.

Other
Walter is a traditional Chief and head of Pelebo-Nworlu War Canoe House of Isaka. He has a wife and two daughters, Lolia and Sambi.

References

1967 births
Living people
People from Okrika (local government area)
Commissioners of ministries of Rivers State
First Wike Executive Council
Rivers State Peoples Democratic Party politicians
University of Port Harcourt alumni